Covers the Hits is an album released in 2000 by American country music artist Sammy Kershaw. It is composed of ten cover songs, most of which were reprised from various tribute albums to which Kershaw contributed. Some of the material had been recorded by Kershaw on his studio albums, including "Third Rate Romance", a Top 5 hit for him in 1994. The final track, "Little Bit More", was unreleased, and was recorded by Kershaw during the sessions for his 1997 album Labor of Love.

Track listing
"Third Rate Romance", "More Than I Can Say", "Chevy Van", and "Memphis, Tennessee" had been recorded by Kershaw on previous studio albums.

Production
Buddy Cannon and Norro Wilson (tracks 1, 4)
Keith Stegall (tracks 2, 6, 7, 10)
Jerry Crutchfield, Martin Crutchfield (track 3)
Buddy Cannon, Norro Wilson, Sammy Kershaw (tracks 5, 9)
Keith Stegall, Ira Antelis (track 8)

References

Allmusic (see infobox)

2000 albums
Covers albums
Sammy Kershaw albums
Mercury Records compilation albums